Verity Smith is a rugby player and LGBT+ rights activist based in the United Kingdom. He has served as diversity and inclusion lead for International Gay Rugby, and previously played rugby union for Rotherham Phoenix and rugby league for Dewsbury Moor.

Biography 
Originally from Hull, Smith played a variety of sports in his youth, including association football, ice hockey, and Thai boxing. He began playing rugby at the age of 11, after his grandparents took him to see a Hull Vixens match. After proving talented at the sport, he obtained permission to play for the Hull Ladies senior side as a teenager, eventually being picked to represent North East of England. 

In 2016, he came out as a transgender man, and continued to play rugby during his transition. He has spoken about facing transphobia while playing rugby, including having blood spat in his mouth and having match officials mock him. In October 2019, he filed a complaint with the Independent Press Standards Organisation after The Sunday Times used a photo of him to illustrate an article suggesting that trans women posed a danger in rugby. The newspaper later replaced the photo and issued a statement saying that the use of the photo had been "inappropriate and misleading in terms of both his gender and his views."

In 2019, he suffered a severe spinal injury after being tackled by a female player. After recovering from the injury, he played wheelchair rugby with the Leeds Rhinos.

In February 2020, Smith attended a forum held by World Rugby as a representative of International Gay Rugby to discuss its transgender participation guidelines. At the forum, Smith was the only transgender rugby player in attendance and was not given the opportunity to present testimony. Later that year, World Rugby announced a controversial change in its guidelines that would effectively ban trans women from playing in women's competitions. Smith condemned the ban, saying that it was "about policing female bodies," and that the research presented in the forum had been performed entirely on cisgender athletes "with an assumption that trans women fall under the category of cis elite males," meaning that there was "no research on trans women within the rugby environment."

References 

Living people

Year of birth missing (living people)
Transgender rights activists
Transgender sportsmen
British LGBT sportspeople
LGBT rugby union players
Wheelchair rugby players
British LGBT rights activists